A number of ships have been named Maria Luisa, including –
 , an Italian-registered cargo ship that operated under that name from 1927 and sank in 1929
 , a Liberian-registered cargo ship that operated under that name from 1956 until 1963

See also
 , an Italian cargo ship in service 1949–52

Ship names